is a former Japanese football player who used to play as a Goalkeeper for National Police Commissary, Albirex Niigata Phnom Penh, and Cambodia Tiger in the Cambodian League.and he moved to Reinmeer Aomori FC Japan Football League Division1.
He works as a goalkeeper coach for Phnom Penh Crown in the Cambodian League.

Club career
Australia Brisbane Roar(former Queensland Roar) as Trainee
Australia Logan United(Queensland Australia)
Cambodia National Police Commissary
Cambodia Albirex Niigata Phnom Penh
Cambodia Cambodia Tiger
Japan Reinmeer Aomori FC

References

1982 births
Living people
Japanese footballers
Expatriate footballers in Cambodia
Association football goalkeepers
Angkor Tiger FC players
Japanese expatriate sportspeople in Cambodia